Them Changes is an album by American artist Buddy Miles, released in June 1970. It reached number 8 on the 1970 Jazz Albums chart, number 35 on the Billboard 200 and number 14 on the 1971 R&B albums charts.

Reception

Writing for Allmusic, music critic Steve Kurutz called the album "quite simply, one of the great lost treasures of soul inspired rock music... definitely worth the extra effort to try to locate." Conversely, Robert Christgau wrote "His singing is too thin to carry two consecutive cuts, his drumming has to be exploited by subtler musicians, and the title cut is the only decent song he ever wrote."

Track listing
"Them Changes" (Buddy Miles) – 3:22
"I Still Love You, Anyway" (Charlie Karp) – 4:14
"Heart's Delight" (Miles) – 4:08
"Dreams" (Gregg Allman) – 4:53
"Down by the River" (Neil Young) – 6:22
"Memphis Train" (Rufus Thomas) – 2:57
"Paul B. Allen, Omaha, Nebraska" (Miles) – 5:33
"Your Feeling Is Mine" (Otis Redding) – 2:13

Personnel
Buddy Miles – vocals, drums, bass, guitar, keyboards, background vocals
Bob Hogins – keyboards, organ, piano, electric piano, trombone, background vocals
Charlie Karp – guitar, background vocals
Andre Lewis – clavinet, organ, piano, background vocals
Robin McBride – electric harpsichord, keyboards, piano, background vocals
Billy Cox – bass, fuzz bass
David Hull – bass, background vocals
Roland Robinson – bass
Marlo Henderson – guitar, background vocals
Jim McCarty – guitar
Wally Rossunolo – guitar
Duane Hitchings – organ
Bob Parkins – organ
Teddy Blandin – trumpet
Peter Carter – trumpet
Tom Hall – trumpet
James Tatum – tenor saxophone
Mark Williams – tenor saxophone, background vocals
Phil Woods – flugelhorn, piano, background vocals
Toby Wynn – baritone saxophone
Lee Allen – saxophone
Bobby Pittman – tenor saxophone, alto saxophone
Fred Allen – background vocals

Production notes
Steve Cropper – producer
Buddy Miles – producer, arranger
Robin McBride – producer
Bob Hogins – arranger
Charlie Karp – arranger
Warren Dewey – engineer
Alan Hendler – engineer
Fred Breitberg – assistant engineer
Bruce Swedien – mixing engineer
Richard Germinaro – design
Burnell Caldwell – photography
John Craig – design consultant
Dean Rudland – liner notes
Desmond Strobel – art direction

References

1970 albums
Buddy Miles albums
Mercury Records albums
Albums produced by Steve Cropper